The 1989 NHL Supplemental Draft was the fourth NHL Supplemental Draft. It was held on June 16, 1989.

Selections by round

Round one
The first round was limited to teams that missed the 1989 Stanley Cup playoffs.

Round two

See also
1989 NHL Entry Draft
1989–90 NHL season
List of NHL players

References

External links
 1989 NHL Supplemental Draft player stats at The Internet Hockey Database

1989
Supplemental Draft